Travis Bruce Moursund (July 9, 1901 – October 21, 1959) was an American politician.

Moursund served in the Texas House of Representatives from 1927 to 1929 and was a Democrat.

Notes

1901 births
1959 deaths
Democratic Party members of the Texas House of Representatives
20th-century American politicians